Helge "Bulge, Arbuckle" Bostrom (January 9, 1894 – January 23, 1977) was a Canadian professional ice hockey player who played 90 games in the National Hockey League. Born in Winnipeg, Manitoba, he played for the Chicago Black Hawks.

Bostrom also played for the Edmonton Eskimos in the Western Canada Hockey League (WCHL), and with the Vancouver Maroons in both the Pacific Coast Hockey Association (PCHA) and the WCHL.

Career statistics

Playing career

Coaching

External links 

Obituary at LostHockey.com

1894 births
1977 deaths
Canadian ice hockey defencemen
Chicago Blackhawks captains
Chicago Blackhawks players
Edmonton Eskimos (ice hockey) players
Ice hockey people from Winnipeg
Vancouver Maroons players
Winnipeg Monarchs players